Amblar-Don is a comune of the Val di Non in the Trentino, northern Italy. It came into existence on 1 January 2016 through the merger of the formerly separate comuni of Amblar and Don.

References

Municipalities of Trentino